Friedrich Dedekind (1524 – February 27, 1598) was a German humanist, theologian, and bookseller.

Born in Neustadt am Rübenberge, he was educated at the universities of Marburg (1543) and Wittenberg, where he studied theology.  At Wittenberg, his talents were recognized by Philipp Melanchthon.  As magister, he became in 1575 a minister and inspector of churches in Lüneburg.

He wrote plays and in later years became involved in mediating theological disputes.

He died on February 27, 1598, at Lüneburg.

Dedekind's Grobianus
Dedekind was the author of Grobianus et Grobiana: sive, de morum simplicitate, libri tres (Cologne, 1558).  This work had first been published in 1549 as Grobianus, but it appeared with additions known as Grobiana in 1554.

A poem in Latin elegiac verse, it was first published in two books in 1549, and revised form and enlarged to three books in 1552. Dedekind's work had an immense popularity across Continental Europe.

The work describes the fictional Saint Grobian as a counselor who teaches men on how to avoid bad manners, gluttony, and drunkenness.

The "Schoole" was imagined as a place where one was instructed to use one's greasy fingers to grab at the nicest portions of any dish and snatch food belonging to fellow diners. Holding back the desire to urinate, fart, and vomit is taught to be bad for one's health; thus, one has to indulge freely in all three activities.

The work also inspired Thomas Dekker's The Guls Horne-Booke (1609).

The Portrait of Friedrich Dedekind was found in Hannover (2008) by: Eberhard Doll, hidden for more than 400 years under the front cover of his own personal Bible, at the Gottfried Whilhelm Leibniz Library. This portrait was painted in beautiful water colors and underneath, a hand-written autograph in Latin was dedicated to his elder son Euricius. Signed by Friedrich, Luneburg 1589.

Plays
 Der christliche Ritter ("The Christian Knight") (1576)
 Papista conversus (1596)

External links
Polybiblio: Grobianus et Grobiana: sive, de morum simplicitate, libri tres 
Gull’s Hornbook 

Facsimile des "Grobianus"
Biographischer Artikel zu Friedrich Dedekind im BBKL 

1524 births
1598 deaths
People from Neustadt am Rübenberge
German Renaissance humanists
16th-century German Lutheran clergy
German booksellers
Literature of the German Renaissance
German male writers